Edge Hill United FC is an Australian football club based in the Cairns, Queensland that plays in the fifth-tier Far North Queensland Premier League.

Club information
Edge Hill United FC was founded in 1967.

In 2019 and 2020, both their men's and women's sides have been dominant teams in the community divisions of Far North Queensland winning back-to-back trebles.

In 2021, they qualified for the FFA Cup as a fifth tier side, after defeating second tier NPL Queensland side Magpies Crusaders United in the final round of qualifying by a score of 3–1, becoming the only community club to advance to the Final Rounds of the 2021 FFA Cup. They were defeated 2-0 in the Round of 32 by second-tier NPL Queensland side Gold Coast Knights after allowing two late goals.

Notable players
Primarily focused on youth development, notable players who have played with the club include former Australian national team players Frank Farina, Shane Stefanutto, and Michael Thwaite, former Papua New Guinea national team player Nathaniel Lepani, and former Auckland City FC player Takuya Iwata.

References

Queensland State League soccer teams
Sport in Cairns
Association football clubs established in 1967
1967 establishments in Australia